The 1973 Singapore Grand Prix was a motor race held at the Thomson Road Grand Prix circuit on 22 April 1973. It was the final Singapore Grand Prix before the cancellation of the event, which resumed in 2008 as a round of the Formula One World Championship. The race was contested over 50 laps and was won by Vern Schuppan driving a March. The race was run to Australian Formula Two rules.

Report

Background
John MacDonald had a brand new Brabham BT40 delivered to him for the race. However, his team ran into difficulty due to fuel pick-up problems with the new car.

In the 1972 event, the 28-year-old Singaporean driver Lionel Chan was involved in an accident which saw his car roll into a ditch on the fourth lap after losing a wheel and hitting an official car. He was taken to hospital but fell into a coma and later died. The circuit was considered dangerous and the Singaporean Minister of Social Affairs, Encik Othman Wok, stated, "I'll be the happiest man when we get a permanent circuit."

Race
Schuppan was leading Malcolm Ramsay's Birrana when Schuppan's March kicked up some stones, puncturing Ramsay's fuel tank and covering him in petrol.

Aftermath

During a support race for touring cars, Swiss driver Joe Huber went off the track into a lamp post. He died six days later as a result of his injuries. The difficulty of implementing adequate safety measures, along with concerns that the Grand Prix was promoting reckless driving, led to motor racing being banned in Singapore after the 1973 Grand Prix. Other contributory factors have been suggested, including an increase in traffic, the inconvenience of having to close roads for the event and also a surge of oil prices stemming from the Suez Crisis. On average the Grand Prix saw one fatality per year, partly due to the nature of the circuit which featured monsoon drains and bus stops. Graeme Lawrence, a three-time winner of the Singapore Grand Prix, believed that the Thomson Road circuit was one of the most dangerous in the world.

A permanent track incorporating a sports complex was proposed as a replacement for the Thomson Road circuit, but this did not come to fruition.

Classification

Starting grid

Race

References

Grand Prix
Singapore Grand Prix
Singapore Grand Prix